Howard L. Jacobs is an American attorney in Westlake Village, California, who has represented 200 or more athletes in disciplinary cases involving anti-doping, salary disputes, team selection issues, and civil litigation matters.  He has been consistently ranked by Chambers Guide USA as one of the leading sports lawyers.

Clients include 
 Tennis player Maria Sharapova in 2016
 UFC fighter Jon Jones in 2016
 UFC fighter Brock Lesnar in 2016
 Swimmer Park Tae Hwan in 2016 and 2015
 Track cyclist Bobby Lea in 2016
 Track & field athlete Veronica Campbell Brown in 2014
 Swimmer Yulia Efimova in 2014
 Tennis player Marin Cilic in 2013
 Basketball player Diana Taurasi in 2011
 Track & field athlete LaShawn Merritt in 2011
 Cyclist Floyd Landis (see Floyd Landis doping case)
 Track star Marion Jones in 2006
 Swimmer Jessica Hardy in 2008
 Runner Tim Montgomery

References

External links 
 Website

Year of birth missing (living people)
Living people
American lawyers
People from Westlake Village, California